Unegetey (Ünegetei) is a rural locality (an ulus) in Kurumkansky District, Republic of Buryatia, Russia. The population was 104 as of 2010. There are 7 streets.

Geography 
Unegetey is located 19 km south of Kurumkan (the district's administrative centre) by road. Shadab is the nearest rural locality.

References 

Rural localities in Kurumkansky District